"The Truth of Fact, the Truth of Feeling" is a  science fiction story by American writer Ted Chiang. It was first published in 2013 in  Subterranean Press.

Synopsis

In the near future, a journalist observes how the world, his daughter, and he himself are affected by "Remem", a form of lifelogging whose advanced search algorithms effectively grant its users eidetic memory of everything that ever happened to them, and the ability to perfectly and objectively share those memories. In a parallel narrative strand, a Tiv man is one of the first of his people to learn to read and write, and discovers that this may not be compatible with oral tradition.

Reception
"Truth" was a finalist for the 2014 Hugo Award for Best Novelette.  Charlie Jane Anders compared it to Black Mirror, and Gary K. Wolfe described it as a "deeply thoughtful meditation." Strange Horizons assessed the narrator's tone as "imperfect" and a "mimicry" of journalism, with the near-future narrative "overreach(ing)" and "fail(ing) to find its balance", and plot revelations that feel "unbelievable rather than shocking", while Tor.com called it "compelling" and "an elegant, technical piece", but conceded that it is "slow moving".

References

External links
Text of the story, at Subterranean Press
The Truth of Fact, the Truth of Feeling at the Internet Speculative Fiction Database

Short stories by Ted Chiang
2013 short stories
American short stories
Novelettes
Subterranean Press books